The Popelogan River is a tributary of the Eastern shore Upsalquitch River, flowing particularly through the Addington Parish, in Restigouche County, in the Northwest the New Brunswick, in Canada.

In his course to the south, the Popelogan river flows through a valley increasingly deep in the mountainous terrain. Its main tributaries are the Gordon Brook and the "Lake Popelogan Branch" which supplies at Popelogan Lake. A forest road serves the upper part of the river, from Popelogan Depot.

Geography 

Popelogan river rises at the West side of White Meadows, in the Addington Parish, at  West of the boundary of the Addington Parish. The upper part of the Popelogan river flows Southwest into a small valley, which extends towards the Northeast towards the watershed of Goullette Brook, a tributary of the Charlo River.

The source of the Popelogan river is located in forest area:
  Northeast of the confluence of the Popelogan river;
  Southeast of the confluence of the Upsalquitch River;
  South of Campbellton bridge, crossing the Restigouche River.

From the source, the river Popelogan flows on  according to the following segments:

  to the Southwest, up to the limit of the Balmoral Parish, Restigouche County;
  to the South in the Balmoral Parish, making a detour to the East, up to the limit of Addington Parish, Restigouche County;
  to the Southwest in the Addington Parish up to a stream (from the Southwest);
  to the South, up to the "Branch Lake Popelogan" (from the East);
  to the Southwest, up to Arsenault Brook (from the Southeast);
  to the North, up to Petteller Gulch (from the North);
  to the South, up to the confluence of the river Popelogan

The Popelogan River empties on the East bank of the Upsalquitch River, in the Crooked Rapids area. The confluence of the river Popelogan is located at:
  Southeast of the confluence of the Upsalquitch River;
  South of the Campbellton, New Brunswick bridge, crossing the Restigouche River.

Toponymy 

The term Popelogan is a used in other toponymical names in the same sector including lake, depot, river and «Little Popelogan Brook".

See also 

 
 Restigouche County
 Balmoral Parish
 Addington Parish
 Chaleur Bay
 Gulf of Saint Lawrence
 Restigouche River
 Upsalquitch River
 List of rivers of New Brunswick

References

External links 
 Internet Site: Restigouche.org - Conseil de Gestion du Bassin Versant de la Rivière Restigouche inc - Restigouche Watershed Management Council inc

Rivers of New Brunswick
Canadian Heritage Rivers